Alishar Rural District is a rural district (dehestan) in Kharqan District, Zarandieh County, Markazi Province, Iran. At the 2006 census, its population was 2,349, in 626 families. The rural district has 6 villages.

References 

Rural Districts of Markazi Province
Zarandieh County